Estrella is the sixth studio album by Lycia, released in 1998 by Projekt Records.

Track listing

Personnel 
Adapted from the Estrella liner notes.
Lycia
 Mike VanPortfleet – vocals, synthesizer, guitar, drum machine
 Tara VanFlower – vocals
Production and additional personnel
 Jason Rau – mastering
 Sam Rosenthal – mastering, design
 Tondalaya – photography

Release history

References

External links 
 
 Estrella at Bandcamp
 Estrella at iTunes

1998 albums
Lycia (band) albums
Projekt Records albums